Belfry Witches is a British television show broadcast by the BBC during its CBBC slot. It ran for just over a year, airing in September 1999 and running its thirteenth and final episode in November 2000.

The show followed two witches, Skirty Marm (Laura Sadler) and Old Noshie (Lucy Davis) as they caused mischief in a quiet English village named Tranter's End, which they fled to after being banished their home on Witch Island. The show revolved around the two witches, the friendly rector of the church whose belfry they are in, Chris Tucker (played by Scott Charles), the resident "naughty boy", a nasty woman named Mrs Bagg-Meanly (played by Paula Jacobs), and the Head Witch who banished Skirty Marm and Old Noshie - Mrs Abercrombie (Jan Harvey). The show was called 'Belfry Witches' because the two witches lived in a church belfry. The show was axed due to poor ratings.

The show was based on the children's book series by author and journalist Kate Saunders. It was never released either on video or DVD.

Theme Tune
The theme tune was performed by the all-female pop group Atomic Kitten and was called 'Something Spooky'. It was released as a B-side on the 1999 single Right Now.

References

External links

1999 British television series debuts
2000 British television series endings
1990s British children's television series
2000s British children's television series
BBC children's television shows
British children's fantasy television series
English-language television shows
Witchcraft in television